Marcus Strickland (born February 24, 1979) is an American jazz soprano, alto, and tenor saxophonist. He was born in Gainesville, Florida, and grew up in Miami. Down Beat magazine's Critics' Poll named him 'Rising Star on Tenor Saxophone' in 2010 and 'Rising Star on Soprano Saxophone' in 2008. JazzTimes magazine's Reader's Poll named him 'Best New Artist' in 2006. He placed third in the 2002 Thelonious Monk International Jazz Saxophone Competition.

His band and concept project, Twi-Life deals with the connection and intersection between jazz and Soul & Hip Hop as inspired by the J Dilla aesthetic of intricacy, “drunk drumming” and tonal nuance. Strickland becomes beat maker, composer as well as saxophonist on these projects.

The saxophonist has nine releases as a leader: People of the Sun (2018), Nihil Novi (2016) on Blue Note Records; Triumph of the Heavy, Vol 1 & 2 (2011), Idiosyncrasies (2009), Open Reel Deck (2007), & Twi-Life (2006) on his own music label Strick Muzik (launched in 2006); Of Song (2009)on Criss Cross Records; Brotherhood (2002) & At Last (2001) on Fresh Sound Records.

In addition to his own Twi-Life, trio and quartet, Strickland has played with Christian McBride, Dave Douglas, Jeff 'Tain' Watts, and also had a five-year stint with the drummer Roy Haynes. Strickland has been on two Grammy-nominated recordings (including Fountain of Youth - Roy Haynes & Keystone). He considers his father an early inspiration, as he had been a drummer in jazz and rhythm and blues but is now a lawyer. Marcus' twin brother E.J. Strickland is a drummer, and is a member of Marcus' quartet and leads his own quintet as well.

Select discography

As leader
 At Last (Fresh Sound, 2001)
 Brotherhood (Fresh Sound, 2003)
 Twi-Life (Strick Muzik, 2005)
 Open Reel Deck (Strick Muzik, 2007)
 Of Song (Criss Cross, 2009)
 Idiosyncrasies (Strick Muzik, 2009)
 Triumph of the Heavy, Vol. 1 & 2 (Strick Muzik, 2011)
 Nihil Novi (Blue Note, 2016)
 People of the Sun (Blue Note, 2018)

As sideman
With Bilal
 VOYAGE-19 (2020)

With Dave Douglas
 Keystone (Greenleaf, 2005) 
 Keystone: Live in Seden (Greenleaf, 2006)
 Moonshine (Greenleaf, 2007) 
 Keystone: Live at the Jazz Standard (Greenleaf, 2008)
 Spark of Being (Greenleaf, 2010)

With Roy Haynes
 Fountain of Youth (Dreyfus, 2004)

With Mike Moreno
 Between the Lines (World Culture, 2007)

With Lonnie Plaxico
 Melange (Blue Note, 2001)
 Lonnie Plaxico Live at the 5:01 Jazz Bar (Orchard, 2002)
 Live at the Zinc Bar (Plaxmusic, 2007)

With E. J. Strickland
 In This Day (Strick Muzik, 2009)

With Bart Tarenskeen
 The Outer Rim (B-Art Records, 2013)

With Christian McBride
 Christian McBride's New Jawn (Mack Avenue, 2018)

With Jeff "Tain" Watts
 Detained (Half Note, 2004)
 Folk's Songs (Dark Key, 2007)

With Chris "Daddy" Dave
 Chris Dave and the Drumhedz (Blue Note, 2018)
 Thine People (2021)

With Ben Williams
 State of Art (Concord, 2011)
 Coming of Age (Concord, 2017)
 I Am A Man (Rainbow Blonde, 2020)

With José James
 Merry Christmas from José James (Rainbow Blonde, 2021)

References

External links
Marcus Strickland's website
Strick Muzik
Interview from Alternate Takes, by Angelika Beener
Interview from Jazz Review
Review of Twi-Life at JazzChicago.net
"In Conversation with Marcus Strickland" by Jared Pauley (Jazz.com)

1979 births
Living people
American jazz saxophonists
American male saxophonists
Musicians from Miami
21st-century American saxophonists
21st-century American male musicians
American male jazz musicians
Criss Cross Jazz artists
Blue Note Records artists